The Palm Beach Post is an American daily newspaper serving Palm Beach County in South Florida, and parts of the Treasure Coast. On March 18, 2018, in a deal worth US$42.35 million, The Palm Beach Post and The Palm Beach Daily News were purchased by New Yorkbased New Media Investment Group Inc., which has ever since owned and operated The Palm Beach Post and all circulations and associated digital media sources.

History
The Palm Beach Post began as The Palm Beach County, a weekly newspaper established in 1910. On January 5, 1916, the weekly became a daily, morning publication known as The Palm Beach Post.

In 1934, the Palm Beach businessman Edward R. Bradley bought The Palm Beach Post and The Palm Beach Times, which published daily in the afternoon. In 1947, both were purchased by the longtime resident John Holliday Perry Sr., who owned a Florida newspaper chain of six dailies and 15 weeklies. In 1948, Perry purchased both the Palm Beach Daily News, the main newspaper for the island of Palm Beach, and the society magazine Palm Beach Life.

In June 1969, Cox Enterprises, based in Atlanta, purchased Perry's Palm Beach and West Palm Beach publications and formed Palm Beach Newspapers, Inc. Cox was founded by James M. Cox, a former Ohio governor and the 1920 Democratic presidential candidate who built a media company that today includes daily newspapers; weekly newspapers, radio and television stations; U.S. cable TV systems, local Internet media sites; and Mannheim auto auction locations.

In 1979, The Palm Beach Times was renamed The Evening Times. In 1987, The Evening Times and The Post merged into a single morning newspaper called The Palm Beach Post. In 1989, all assets and archives of the neighboring sister publication Miami News assets and archives were merged with The Palm Beach Post upon the closure of the former newspaper on New Year's Eve in 1988.

In 1996, The Palm Beach Post sponsored the Scripps National Spelling Bee winner Wendy Guey.

The Palm Beach Post photographer Dallas Kinney won the 1970 Pulitzer Prize for Feature Photography for his portfolio of pictures of Florida migrant workers, Migration to Misery. The Post has since had photographers been Pulitzer finalists three times.

The paper became nationally recognized for its coverage of the 2000 presidential election for reporting about flawed ballots occurring in Palm Beach County.

In 2003, The Palm Beach Post won an American Society of Newspaper Editors (ASNE) prize for their coverage on a local bishop's resignation following confirmed sexual abuse allegations.

Editor Edward Sears won the Editor of the Year award in 2004 from Editor & Publisher. Sears led the newsroombof The Post from 1985 to 2005.

On Oct. 31, 2017, Cox Media Group announced its plans to sell The Palm Beach Post and Palm Beach Daily News. In 2018, it was announced that GateHouse Media would buy the newspapers for US$49.25 million, with the deal closing on May 1. As part of the Gannett and GateHouse Media merger of 2019, nine staffers were laid off from The Palm Beach Post in 2020.

Recent operations
In March 1996, PalmBeachPost.com was launched.

In June 2008, the leaders of The Post decided to focus on the core readership area of Palm Beach County and southern Martin County. As digital readership grows, print readership slows. Faced with economic downturn and a changing industry, The Post reduced its payroll of 1,350 to about 1,000 and closes bureaus in Stuart, Port St. Lucie and Delray Beach.

In December 2008, The Post closed its presses and moved printing to the Deerfield Beach plant of the Fort Lauderdale Sun-Sentinel.

On March 18, 2018, The Palm Beach Post was sold to the New York-based New Media Investment Group Inc. in a deal worth US$42.35 million.

In August 2018, The Post had its digital team launch the GateHouse Florida Digital Audience team to expand GateHouse's digital audience across Florida.

On April 4, 2019, the longtime editor Tim Burke accepted a lucrative position worth hundreds of thousands of dollars with LRP Media Group after the sale of The Palm Beach Post and all subsidies to the New York Conglomerate, New Media Investment Group. LRP is currently registered as a political research group in Florida.

On Dec. 17, 2020, The Post named Rick Christie as its executive editor.

See also 
 List of newspapers in Florida

References

External links
 

Mass media in the Miami metropolitan area
Newspapers published in Florida
Palm Beach County, Florida
Publications established in 1916
Pulitzer Prize-winning newspapers
West Palm Beach, Florida
1916 establishments in Florida
Gannett publications